KQMX is a radio station on 105.7 FM in Lost Hills, California. KQMX is owned by Deportes y Música Comunicaciones, LLC and carries a grupera/Regional Mexican format known as Qué Buena 105.7.

History
In June 2006, Magnolia Radio received approval to build an FM station on 99.5 in Lost Hills. It was then sold to Deportes y Muísca. The station remained a construction permit until 2010, when Grupo Multimedia bought the construction permits for KQMX and KRPH near Phoenix, Arizona.

For nearly a full year, from February 18, 2011 to February 15, 2012, KQMX was silent pending a relaunch of the station by Grupo Multimedia/Deportes y Música.

References

External links
 KQMX on Facebook
 

QMX
Radio stations established in 2011
2011 establishments in California
Regional Mexican radio stations in the United States